Pteropurpura dearmata is a species of sea snail, a marine gastropod mollusk in the family Muricidae (the murex snails or rock snails).

Description

Distribution

References

Muricidae
Gastropods described in 1922